Cecilie Redisch Kvamme (born 11 September 1995) is a Norwegian professional footballer who plays as a defender for Toppserien club Brann and Norway.

Kvamme was born in Norway and played youth football for Tertnes before starting her professional career with Arna-Bjornar just outside Bergen. After a short spell at Sandviken, she joined English WSL club West Ham in 2019. She played two seasons with West Ham before returning to Sandviken in 2021.

Kvamme currently has five caps for Norway.

Career statistics

Club 
As of 21 May 2021.

References

External links
 

1995 births
Living people
Footballers from Bergen
Norwegian women's footballers
Norway women's youth international footballers
Norway women's international footballers
Norwegian expatriate sportspeople in England
Expatriate women's footballers in England
Women's association football defenders
Toppserien players
Arna-Bjørnar players
SK Brann Kvinner players
2019 FIFA Women's World Cup players
West Ham United F.C. Women players
Women's Super League players